Paul Decamps (14 January 1884 – 27 June 1915) was a rugby union player, who represented France. He died in the First World War.

References

1884 births
1915 deaths
French rugby union players
French military personnel killed in World War I
Place of birth missing
France international rugby union players